Fluspirilene (Redeptin, Imap, R6218) is a diphenylbutylpiperidine typical antipsychotic drug, used for the treatment of schizophrenia. It is administered intramuscularly. It was discovered at Janssen Pharmaceutica in 1963. A 2007 systematic review investigated the efficacy of fluspirilene decanoate for people with schizophrenia:

Synthesis
Sidechain precursor [3312-04-7] (1) also used for: penfluridol, clopimozide, amperozide, pimozide, lidoflazine.
Piperidine [1021-25-6] also used for Spiroxantrine, Spiperone, Ro65-6570, RP-23618, Spirilene, Spiramide, R 5260 [1109-69-9], etc.

1,1'-(4-Chlorobutylidene)bis(4-fluorobenzene) [3312-04-7] (1) & 1-Phenyl-1,3,8-Triazaspiro[4.5]Decan-4-One [1021-25-6] (2) give  (3).

See also
 Pimozide
 Penfluridol
 Spiperone
 Mosapramine (atypical antipsychotic)

References

Belgian inventions
1-(4,4-Bis(4-fluorophenyl)butyl)piperidines
Janssen Pharmaceutica
Typical antipsychotics
Spiro compounds
Anilines